The 2023 Formula Winter Series is the first season of the Formula Winter Series. It is a multi-event motor racing championship for open wheel, formula racing cars regulated according to FIA Formula 4 regulations, based in Spain. The series is organised by Gedlich Racing with the approval of the RFEDA.

Entry list 

 BWR Motorsports, Rodin Carlin and Monlau Motorsport were scheduled to enter the championship, but did not appear in any rounds.

Race calendar 
The calendar was announced on 20 September 2022. The four rounds are organized by Gedlich Racing. All rounds consist of two qualifiying sessions and two races.

Results

Championship standings

Scoring system 
Points are awarded to the top ten classified drivers, the pole-sitter and the fastest lap holder as follows:

Drivers' championship

Notes

References

External links 

 

Formula Winter Series
Formula Winter Series
Formula Winter Series